South West Island is an island in the Sir Edward Pellew Group in the Gulf of Carpentaria, Northern Territory, Australia. All of its population, numbering 10, lives in South West Island (also called Wathanka or Wathunga), a family outstation on the north coast.

The Sir Edward Pellew Group are the traditional lands of the Yanyuwa people, most of whom now live in Borroloola.

It is home to the canefield rat, which are few in number and considered a threatened species in this area, although plentiful in north-eastern Australia.

References

Islands of the Northern Territory
Gulf of Carpentaria